Óleo (Portuguese for "oil") is a municipality in the state of São Paulo in Brazil. The population is 2,471 (2020 est.) in an area of 198 km². The elevation is 682 m.

References

Municipalities in São Paulo (state)